NewsWireNGR is an independent newsroom that reports underreported or mostly ignored stories by mainstream media organisations in Nigeria and Africa. The all women led newsroom was founded in 2013, the remote team, drives conversational Journalism that leads to and not limited to high level policy actions by government but influences change and drives social movements in the country.

Audience Reach & Impact 

NewsWireNGR journalism has prompted investigations into misconduct at the Abuja Environmental and Protection Board, Shrinking Civic and Media spaces in Nigeria, the Nigerian Railway Cooperation, the Nigerian Ministry of humanitarian affairs and its disbursements of COVID-19 intervention funds to mention a few, leading to changes in government policies across the country.

Funding 
The Platform has been supported by the Google News Initiative, Open Society Initiative for West Africa, OSIWA in the past,

See also 
 Corruption in Nigeria
 Media in Nigeria

References

External links 

 

Society of Nigeria
Online newspapers published in Nigeria